Paranomus spathulatus, the Langeberg sceptre, is a flower-bearing shrub that belongs to the genus Paranomus and forms part of the fynbos. The plant is native to the Western Cape, South Africa.

Description

Sometimes fire destroys the plant and the seeds survive but sometimes the plant sprouts again. The plant is bisexual and is pollinated by insects. The fruit ripens two months after flowering, and the seeds fall to the ground where they are spread by ants.

Distribution and habitat
The plant occurs in the Langeberg from Tradouw Pass to Garcia's Pass.

References

External links

spathulatus